The Flintstones is a pinball game released by Williams in 1994 and based on the movie of the same name which is based on 1960–1966 animated television series of the same name. This machine is not to be confused with another pinball machine, a redemption game, based on the TV series and also released in 1994, manufactured by Innovative Concepts in Entertainment (ICE).

General Information
In 1994, Williams released pinball machine based on the live-action theatrical film adaptation of The Flintstones. This game also featured speech provided by John Goodman, Rick Moranis and Harvey Korman reprising their respective roles, as well the theme song from the television series. This game had a unique feature called smart ramps, this allowed the game to decide which flipper to feed the ball two through a plastic loop at the bottom.

Gameplay

Skill Shot 
When the game is first started, the player is greeted with a skill shot. The skill shot on the machine is the light up the correct light in the "DIG" rollovers at the top of the playfield in which the ball will fall through by using the flippers to move the one lit light back and forth. A few extra million points are awarded when the skill shot is achieved and this amount goes up the more times it is attained.

Bronto Crane 
When the Bronto Crane is first shot (purple lane), it will light the Bronto Crane light, and then when it is shot again, it will lock the ball and display a reward on the DMD above, then launch the ball out of the Bronto Crane toy's mouth. The rewards that may be received are the following:

 1, 2, 3 values are doubled
 Extra Ball
 Spell CONCRETE
 Bowling Power-Up
 Light 2x Playfield
 Multiplier Maxed
 Bedrock Derby

Bowling 
In the middle of the playfield, there is a bowling alley with a few pins. If the player shoots the ramp with the bowling light flashing in front of it, then a bowling sequence will be initiated where one may get strikes, spares, or gutter balls. If the player hits the bowling alley during normal play, the light in front of the three-sectioned alley will illuminate. Once all three sections are lit, the player will complete one word of "Yabba-Dabba-Doo" (Yabba, Dabba, and Doo). Once all three sections of the phrase are completed, a bowling power-up is awarded. This bowling power-up will let the player to get strikes on all shots after achieving it.

If three strikes are scored in a row (this is easy with a bowling power-up), the game goes into a mode called "Bowl-a-Rama". This is a three-ball multi-ball in which the player gets many points for scoring "Super Strikes" and "Super Spares". The mode will end when two of the three balls the player is given are lost.

Machine Time 
There is a toy at the top of the playfield, one that some may call a "Rock Slicer", that will spin the ball around and around a few times and award points when it falls out. This can be achieved by hitting the yellow bird to the left of the playfield when the "Machine Time" light is lit. It will start a 30-second mode in which the player can shoot the far right lane or the purple lane on the left of the play-field, and the ball will get launched into the Machine. This can be done repeatedly until the time in the mode expires.

Dictabird 
The Dictabird is a yellow-green colored bird in the mid-left of the play-field. The Dictabird's yellow target underneath him can be hit to make him wobble back and forth a couple times, as well as advance certain game-play features.

The first gameplay feature that can be activated is "Job Search". When this mode is activated it will light the "Job Search" light on the far right pathway up the play-field. Points are awarded when the path is shot.

The second gameplay feature that can be activated is where the player has to find the kids (Bam-Bam and Pebbles). In order to do this, the player must shoot the left, center, and right pathways (or just one or two depending on how fast they are found) to find where the kids are located. Then, once located, shoot one of the ramps to save them.

Modes 
There are 4 modes in this game, with a Mystery Mode for completing them. A mode can be started by completing 1-2-3 on the ramps. All three shots may not be on the same ramp so it is necessary to look for the lights, and watch to see which flipper the ball goes to. The modes are displayed in a line on the playfield. Lit ones have been played, the flashing one will be started next, and dark ones are yet to be played. Modes can run concurrently, and during multiball. The bumpers change the currently flashing mode. The modes are:

 Fred's Choice 
 Joe's Diner
 Bedrock Water Buffalo's
 Dino Frenzy (2-ball multiball mode)

Once all the modes are completed, the Start Mode light will indicate Mystery Mode, a wizard mode where the player has 20 seconds to knock down the BED and ROCK drop targets for 100 million points. Each target down scores 5 million. The mode ends after 20 seconds, or when the big points are awarded, and Fred's Choice will become the currently flashing mode.

Similar Machine 
A pinball redemption game by Innovative Concepts in Entertainment was also released in 1994. The cabinet was designed to look like a car from the television series. The game features a plastic playfield measuring approximately 3 feet by 5 feet and a 2-inch foil-coated plastic ball. It has two oversized flippers at the bottom and a third regular Data East flipper assembly elevated at mid-playfield. The game also features an oversized LED dot matrix display.

References 
 http://www.ipdb.org/rulesheets/888/flintsto.htm

External links
 
 Recent Auction Results for the Williams The Flintstones pinball machine
 Internet Pinball Database entry for the Innovative Concepts in Entertainment The Flintstones pinball machine

Pinball
Pinball machines based on television series
Pinball machines based on films
Williams pinball machines
1994 pinball machines
The Flintstones